Radical 196 or radical bird meaning "bird" is one of the 6 Kangxi radicals (214 radicals in total) composed of 11 strokes.

In the Kangxi Dictionary, there are 750 characters (out of 49,030) to be found under this radical.

Evolution

Derived characters

Literature

External links

Unihan Database - U+9CE5

196
114